Hornets’ Nest is a 1970 Italian-American war film directed by Phil Karlson and starring Rock Hudson, Sylva Koscina, and Sergio Fantoni. The plot focuses on a group of boys aged 7–14 who survive a massacre in their village in Northern Italy in 1944 and what happens to them. The film was attacked by critics for its depiction of children learning about violence. Many critics felt that the film went to unnecessary lows. It failed at the box office and Rock Hudson moved into TV acting after this film.

Plot
In Northern Italy in 1944, the entire population of the village of Reanoto is massacred by the SS under the command of the cruel Major Sturmbannführer Taussig for helping the Italian resistance movement.  The only survivors are a group of young boys in ages from 7 to 14 led by Aldo, who witnessed the mass execution and vow revenge.

That night, a detachment of US Army paratrooper saboteurs jump into the area with a mission to destroy a strategic dam with the partisans prior to the Fifth United States Army's advance into the area.  Their drop zone has been discovered by Wehrmacht troops under the command of Hauptmann Friedrich von Hecht, who kill them all except the leader of the paratroopers, Captain Turner, who is rendered unconscious and goes unnoticed by the Germans when he lands in the branches of a tree. The Germans capture the demolition equipment from the dead Americans.

Aldo and his friends rescue Turner by spiriting him away from the ambush.  Realising that Turner needs medical attention, they kidnap German doctor Bianca Freedling, to nurse him to health, and keeping her captive even after Turner's recovery. In order to avenge the massacre of Reanoto, Aldo wants Turner to train him and his friends in the use of military weapons and tactics.  Turner uses the opportunity as a second chance to complete his sabotage mission, using the boys instead of his late command.  He has the boys steal the captured American demolition gear from von Hecht's headquarters, killing SS Rottenführer Gunther in the process, but Aldo hides the detonators until Turner leads them in their revenge. He trains them to use German MP40 guns.

Turner and the doctor go to look at the dam.  The doctor tries to stab Turner with a pair of scissors and then runs towards a passing German armoured car but Turner drags her into cover and rapes her.

In response to the killing of Gunther, Standartenführer Jannings hunts for Turner and his "Dead End Kids" an SS-led affair, placing von Hecht under the command of Taussig and reassigning his regular Wehrmacht troops to guard a tunnel. Not long after this, Turner and the boys steal a truck and drive to SS headquarters, slaughtering all of Taussig's men in a surprise attack. Killing the SS was enough for most of the boys, but not for Aldo, who is becoming emotionally and mentally unhinged. He wants to keep killing Germans.

Von Hecht, after an argument, shoots and kills Taussig in the aftermath of the attack on SS headquarters, and goes after Turner and the boys solo. While Turner and a few of the boys are planting Composition C charges on the dam, Aldo and a few of the others go against orders and directly engage the German guards on top of the dam, which very nearly costs the entire mission. Taking over an MG42, Aldo becomes blood-drunk as he mows down Germans, even going so far as to shoot down his own friend Carlo when Carlo blocks his shot. Despite interference from von Hecht, Turner and the kids successfully plant the explosives and blow up the dam, flooding the valley.

With the dam destroyed and the Germans routed, the American troops begin moving in. When Turner learns of Carlo's death, as well as that of another boy who died protecting Bianca and some of the younger children, he regrets having involved the children and breaks all of the guns. Aldo however refuses to hand his over, and runs off, encountering von Hecht, who survived the destruction of the dam. Aldo shoots and wounds him just as Turner catches up to him, and after failing to talk him out of finishing the German officer off, prevents him by force, taking his gun away. He takes von Hecht prisoner as von Hecht expresses his admiration for Turner's success.

Turner, Bianca, von Hecht and all of the surviving boys except for Aldo go down to meet the approaching column of American soldiers. Aldo lingers. After seeing to it that the others are safely aboard a truck, Turner goes back for Aldo, who angrily throws rocks at him because he stopped him from killing von Hecht. But finally he is overcome with remorse for having killed Carlo, and begs Turner's forgiveness. Turner gives it, and scoops the defeated and frightened boy up, and carries him to the waiting truck.

Cast

Production
Hudson had previously had success with several military roles, such as Ice Station Zebra.  After the failure of the large budgeted Darling Lili, he thought an action war film geared to the youth market directed by the experienced Phil Karlson had potential.  The female lead was originally to have been played by Sophia Loren, but she dropped out at the last moment and was replaced by Koscina. Koscina, who had a childhood in World War II Yugoslavia, felt that the idea of the film of war destroying mentally as well as physically was an interesting one. Her role as a female German doctor captured by partisans was similar to the lead in the acclaimed The Last Bridge.

Though set in 1944, the hairstyles, American fatigues and attitudes are from the late 1960s, with Hudson first wearing the moustache he would have throughout the 1970s.  Time Magazine called the film “a weird little war movie full of bizarre energy and merciless violence, a kind of ‘Dirty Dozen Reach Puberty’”. Ennio Morricone's score included a whistling theme that was used in the film by the children themselves.

Michael Avallone wrote a novelisation of the film as a tie-in.  An exploitation guide for cinema owners suggested dressing up boys under 15 in army uniforms and putting actual hornets' nests (hopefully without their makers) in shop windows to promote the film.

Reception
In what would be the last year of film productions about war, this film opened in both Europe and the U.S. to controversy. Critics attacked the film for its depiction of children learning violence and going to war with an American leading them: there was even a sexual assault by both the boys and later Turner on Koscina's German nurse. Many felt that such depictions did not make a good war film and felt this particular film went to unnecessary lows. This, plus the anachronistic touches in sets and costumes and resentment over the ongoing Vietnam War happening at the time, led the film to fail at the box office, along with other war films like Catch-22, Murphy's War, and Waterloo. After this film, Rock Hudson turned to TV and the show McMillan and Wife.

See also
 List of American films of 1970

References

External links
 
 
 

1970 films
1970 war films
American war films
Macaroni Combat films
English-language Italian films
Italian Campaign of World War II films
Films scored by Ennio Morricone
Films directed by Phil Karlson
World War II films based on actual events
1970s American films
1970s Italian films